This is a list of the most populous cities and towns of Mozambique. It is based on the most recent census done for each city or town.

From these 17 cities shown here they all collectively have a population of 6 million while the population of the entire country ranges at 29 million thus showing that majority of the population still live in rural areas.

See also
List of cities in Mozambique

References

Cities by Population
Mozambique